The purí (also puri, puri-cororado, coroado, colorado, telikong and paqui) tribe lived along the northern coast of South America and in Brazil. They are now extinct but have mixed with people of Paraiba do Sul, though last original groups were last found in the lowlands of the Mato Grosso.

Due to the disappearance of their society having occurred prior to the 20th century, they were still seen as "faithless, primitive half-man half-beasts," in accordance to the Portuguese Empire's general view on indigenous peoples (already manifested in Africa), focused on ethnology rather than history.

Accounts and modern research 
According to Brazilian journalist and UENF press secretary Fulvia D'Alessandri, the Puri were nomadic and inhabited the region of São Paulo. By the 17th century, most if not all of the tribe's population traveled along the Paraíba do Sul river in order to escape the "entradas and bandeiras" that would make use of them for gold exploration. Eventually, they settled in the inner bay of Paraíba, between the rivers Pomba, Negro and Muriaé.

In a study called "Diversidade étnica dos indígenas na bacia do baixo Paraíba do Sul. Representações construídas a partir da Etnohistória e da Arqueologia" by historian Dr. Simonne Teixeira (also from UENF), the accounts of travelers and foreign naturalists from the 19th century are cited. When such accounts occurred, the Puri were already socially fragmented, due to the influences of colonization. Italian friars commanded two important settlements in the region, with which many Puri kept work relations: "São José de Leonissa" (now São Fidélis) and "Aldeia da Pedra" (now Itaocara). Even so, accounts such as that of Wied-Neuw and Burmeist, which had both been in the region during the 19th century, there were still nomadic Puri groups at the time, that carried only the absolutely necessary to survive in their harsh, dense vegetation environment.

Both the German naturalist Maximilian von Wied-Neuwied and Burmeist describe the nomadic Puri of the 19th century. Burmeist states that their huts were very light habitations, built of palm tree leaves and "resembling bird cages", while Wied-Neuw speaks of their simplicity and lack of attachment to structures and land, valuing only few tools. With the deforestation resulting from the extensive coffee plantations of the time, the nomadic peoples of Brazil lost much of their space, and many the remaining Puri were forced to work in the farms, as domestic workers and, especially, as lumberjacks for the clearing of the forest and carrying of wood through the river, forming a cheap workforce for landowners. There are accounts of misery among the Puri for the entire 19th century, as workers were severely underpaid (sometimes even receiving salary in tobacco, aguardiente and "colorful textiles"), and by the end of the century, they were considered as "extinct", leading to the belief that they were assimilated into Brazilian society over time, rather than being victim of the genocides proposed to other tribes (such as the Goitacá people, said to have been decimated for not accepting Portuguese rule).

See also
 Purian languages

References

Purian languages
Ethnic groups in Brazil
Extinct ethnic groups